Blackburn Welfare F.C. was an English football club located in Brough, East Riding of Yorkshire.

History
The club joined the Yorkshire League in 1971, and spent four seasons in the competition's Third Division before re-joining local football.

Records
Best League performance: 7th, Yorkshire League Division 3, 1972–73

References

Defunct football clubs in England
Yorkshire Football League
Defunct football clubs in the East Riding of Yorkshire
Works association football teams in England